The USS Eolus was a 368-ton side wheel steamship that served in the Union Navy from 1864 to 1865 before becoming a commercial steamship.

Union Navy
Eolus was built at Newburgh, New York, for civilian employment, but was purchased by the Union Navy upon completion. Outfitted as a gunboat, she was commissioned in August 1864 and, following a brief search off the Atlantic Coast for the Confederate raider CSS Tallahassee, joined the blockading forces off North Carolina.

Eolus patrolled the coast, rivers, and sounds of North Carolina, enforcing the blockade and acting as picket. She carried men, messages, mail, supplies, orders, and ammunition to the large ships of the squadron and transferred their wounded to hospital ships. During October 1864 she captured the blockade runner Hope and assisted in the capture of the Lady Sterling. Late in the year and in mid-January 1865 Eolus took part in the attacks that captured Fort Fisher, thus closing the port of Wilmington to blockade runners. She continued operations in North Carolina waters from then until after the Civil War's end.

Civilian service
In June 1865, Eolus went north to Boston, Massachusetts, for decommissioning. USS Eolus was sold at the beginning of August 1865 and soon began a long career as a commercial steamer. She was broken up in 1894.

References

External links 
  USS Eolus (1864-1865)
 Eolus (DANFS)

Gunboats of the United States Navy
Ships of the Union Navy
Ships built in Newburgh, New York
American Civil War patrol vessels of the United States
Steamships of the United States Navy
1864 ships